The 2011–12 season of Everton F.C. was the club's 20th season in the Premier League and 58th consecutive season in the top division of English football. It was also Everton's 113th season of league football and 115th season in all competitions. The club entered the League Cup in the second round and were knocked out in the fourth round following a 1–2 home defeat to Chelsea. The club entered the FA Cup in the third round and advanced all the way to the semi-finals where they faced rivals Liverpool, at Wembley, for the first time since 1989. Everton's run ensured they stretched their number of quarter-final appearances in the competition to 41, which is a record. Despite taking the lead in the semi-final, Everton lost the game 1–2.

Everton's Premier League campaign was delayed by a week due to the London riots forcing a postponement of their scheduled starting match at Tottenham Hotspur. In January, manager David Moyes became the fourth boss to win 150 Premier League games in its 20-year history, after Sir Alex Ferguson, Arsène Wenger and Harry Redknapp. Everton finished in seventh place, boasting a nine-game-long unbeaten run in the league to end the season. The unbeaten run was led by winter signing Nikica Jelavić, who scored nine goals in thirteen league games, and was awarded with the Premier League Player of the Month award for April for his efforts.

Results

Preseason

Premier League

League Cup

FA Cup

League table

Players

First-team squad

Out on loan

Statistics

League results summary

Appearances

|-
|colspan="14"|Players who no longer play for Everton but have made appearances this season:

|}

Goalscorers

Clean sheets

Includes all competitive matches.

{| class="wikitable" style="font-size: 95%; text-align: center;"
|-
!width=15|
!width=15|
!width=150|Name
!width=80|Premier League
!width=80|FA Cup
!width=80|League Cup
!width=80|Total
|-
|1
|
|Tim Howard
|12
|3
|0
|15
|-
|2
|
|Ján Mucha
|0
|0
|0
|0
|-
|colspan="2"|
|Total
|12
|3
|0
|15

Disciplinary record
Includes all competitive matches. Sorting is based on the UEFA Fair Play criteria that a yellow card is worth one point and a red card is worth three points.

{| class="wikitable" style="font-size: 95%; text-align: center;"
|-
! rowspan="2"  style="width:2.5%; text-align:center;"|
! rowspan="2"  style="width:3%; text-align:center;"|
! rowspan="2"  style="width:12%; text-align:center;"|Name
! colspan="3" style="text-align:center;"|Premier League
! colspan="3" style="text-align:center;"|League Cup
! colspan="3" style="text-align:center;"|FA Cup
! colspan="3" style="text-align:center;"|Total
|-
!  style="width:25px; background:#fe9;"|
!  style="width:28px; background:#ff8888;"|
!  style="width:25px; background:#ff8888;"|
!  style="width:25px; background:#fe9;"|
!  style="width:28px; background:#ff8888;"|
!  style="width:25px; background:#ff8888;"|
!  style="width:25px; background:#fe9;"|
!  style="width:28px; background:#ff8888;"|
!  style="width:25px; background:#ff8888;"|
!  style="width:25px; background:#fe9;"|
!  style="width:28px; background:#ff8888;"|
!  style="width:25px; background:#ff8888;"|
|-
|1
|
|Tim Cahill
|5
|0
|1
|0
|0
|0
|1
|0
|0
|6
|0
|1
|-
|=
|
|Royston Drenthe
|5
|0
|0
|1
|1
|0
|0
|0
|0
|6
|1
|0
|-
|=
|
|Marouane Fellaini
|6
|0
|0
|2
|0
|0
|1
|0
|0
|9
|0
|0
|-
|4
|
|Leighton Baines
|7
|0
|0
|0
|0
|0
|0
|0
|0
|7
|0
|0
|-
|=
|
|John Heitinga
|4
|0
|0
|0
|0
|0
|3
|0
|0
|7
|0
|0
|-
|6
|
|Sylvain Distin
|4
|0
|0
|0
|0
|0
|2
|0
|0
|6
|0
|0
|-
|=
|
|Steven Pienaar
|6
|0
|0
|0
|0
|0
|0
|0
|0
|6
|0
|0
|-
|8
|
|Jack Rodwell
|2
|0
|1
|0
|0
|0
|0
|0
|0
|2
|0
|1
|-
|=
|
|Darron Gibson
|3
|0
|0
|0
|0
|0
|2
|0
|0
|5
|0
|0
|-
|10
|
|Phil Neville
|3
|0
|0
|0
|0
|0
|1
|0
|0
|4
|0
|0
|-
|11
|
|Nikica Jelavić
|1
|0
|0
|0
|0
|0
|2
|0
|0
|3
|0
|0
|-
|=
|
|Leon Osman
|3
|0
|0
|0
|0
|0
|0
|0
|0
|3
|0
|0
|-
|13
|
|Séamus Coleman
|2
|0
|0
|0
|0
|0
|0
|0
|0
|2
|0
|0
|-
|=
|
|Magaye Gueye
|1
|0
|0
|0
|0
|0
|1
|0
|0
|2
|0
|0
|-
|=
|
|Phil Jagielka
|2
|0
|0
|0
|0
|0
|0
|0
|0
|2
|0
|0
|-
|=
|
|Mikel Arteta
|1
|0
|0
|1
|0
|0
|0
|0
|0
|2
|0
|0
|-
|17
|
|Victor Anichebe
|1
|0
|0
|0
|0
|0
|0
|0
|0
|1
|0
|0
|-
|=
|
|Landon Donovan
|1
|0
|0
|0
|0
|0
|0
|0
|0
|1
|0
|0
|-
|=
|
|Tony Hibbert
|1
|0
|0
|0
|0
|0
|0
|0
|0
|1
|0
|0
|-
|=
|
|Tim Howard
|1
|0
|0
|0
|0
|0
|0
|0
|0
|1
|0
|0
|-
|=
|
|Denis Stracqualursi
|1
|0
|0
|0
|0
|0
|0
|0
|0
|1
|0
|0
|-
|=
|
|Apostolos Vellios
|1
|0
|0
|0
|0
|0
|0
|0
|0
|1
|0
|0
|-
|=
|
|Ján Mucha
|0
|0
|0
|1
|0
|0
|0
|0
|0
|1
|0
|0
|-
|colspan="2"|
|Total
|61
|0
|2
|5
|1
|0
|13
|0
|0
|79
|1
|2
|-

Notes

Home attendances

Overall

Includes all competitive games.
{|class="wikitable"
|-
|Games played || 47 (38 Premier League, 3 League Cup, 6 FA Cup)
|-
|Games won || 21 (15 Premier League, 2 League Cup, 4 FA Cup)
|-
|Games drawn || 12 (11 Premier League) and 1 FA Cup)
|-
|Games lost || 14 (12 Premier League, 1 League Cup and 1 FA Cup)
|-
|Goals scored || 66 (50 Premier League, 6 League Cup, 10 FA Cup)
|-
|Goals conceded || 48 (40 Premier League, 4 League Cup, 4 FA Cup)
|-
|Goal difference || +18 (+10 Premier League, +2 League Cup, +6 FA Cup)
|-
|Clean sheets || 15 (12 Premier League and 3 FA Cup)
|-
|Yellow cards || 79
|-
|Red cards || 3
|-
|Worst discipline || Tim Cahill (1  and 6 ) Royston Drenthe (1  and 6 ) Marouane Fellaini (9 )
|-
|Best results || W 4–0 (H) v Sunderland – Premier League – 9 April 2012W 4–0 (H) v Fulham – Premier League – 28 April 2012
|-
|Worst result || L 3–0 (A) v Liverpool – Premier League – 13 March 2012
|-
|Most appearances || Tim Howard with 44 appearances
|-
|Top scorer || Nikica Jelavić (11 )
|-
|Penalties for || 6/7 (86% converted)
|-
|Penalties against || 3/5 (60% converted)
|-
|Points (League) || 56/114 (49%)
|-
|Win rate || 21/47 games (45%)
|-

Transfers

Transfers in

Transfers out

Loans in

Loans out

Awards

Player of the Month

Premier League Player of the Month

PFA Premier League Team of the Year

End-of-season awards

References

External links
 
 2011–12 Season at ESPN

Everton F.C. seasons
Everton